The Société française de vexillologie (French Society of Vexillology), or SFV, is a free, non-profit association of vexillology and heraldry enthusiasts of France. The centre aims principally at promoting the study of the history, symbolism and usage of flags, and preserving related documents. It was founded in 1985 in Paris and is a FIAV member since 1991.

The organization has an official, six-monthly, journal called Drapeaux et Pavillons, reserved to its members.

See also
 International Federation of Vexillological Associations (FIAV)

References

External links
 Official site 

International Federation of Vexillological Associations
Organizations established in 1985
Educational organizations based in France
Charities based in France
1985 establishments in France